Welcome to Fantasy Island, is the second album from American R&B singer/songwriter Adina Howard. The album was due for release on July 29, 1997, but the album was then shelved. It later received an unofficial release (excluding "T-Shirt & Panties" and "Crank Me Up" which were included on her The Second Coming release under Rufftown Records) on May 19, 2013 through the mixtape site DatPiff.com.

Despite the album never being originally released in 1997, it did however spawn two hit singles, "(Freak) And U Know It" and "T-Shirt & Panties."

In January 2021, it was announced that Rhino Records had acquired the rights to the album and it was finally released onto digital audio platforms on February 19, 2021.

Background
After the success of her debut album Do You Wanna Ride? in addition to her hit soundtrack single "What's Love Got to Do With It?" with Warren G, Howard began work on her sophomore album. During this time, her record label Mecca Don/EastWest Records merged into Elektra Records, headed by label exec Sylvia Rhone. She gained more creative control with the project (originally titling it Portrait of a Lady), being able to hand-pick the songs and working with an array of popular artists such as her then-labelmate Missy Elliott, Bizzy Bone of Bone-Thugs-N-Harmony, DJ Quik, Timbaland, Ginuwine, K-Ci Hailey of Jodeci, and Jamie Foxx. Similar to her debut album, where she recorded a cover of the R&B classic "You Don't Have to Cry," she recorded a cover of the hit Vanity 6 song "Nasty Girl" for the album. However, it eventually did not make the final album tracklist.

Originally set for release on July 29, 1997, the album was preceded by the release of the lead single "[Freak] And U Know It" which was produced by DJ Quik. The song was serviced to radio on May 20, with the music video directed by Francis Lawrence. The single ended up peaking at #70 on the Hot 100, and #32 on R&B (marking her 4th Top40 R&B hit). It also included a B-side track called "Swerve On" featuring Menajahtwa. The album was later pushed back to September 16.

A second single, "T-Shirt & Panties" (which Howard originally wanted as the lead) was planned, and ended up being included on the soundtrack to Woo and released as a single off that project. A remix produced by DJ Clue and featuring Cam'ron and Charli Baltimore was produced. However, despite no formal support from her label, the song became an underground hit and remains one of Howard's most popular songs to perform.

As the album received critical acclaim from such publications as SPIN ("...a sleek, danceable artifact of hip hop-inflected craftmanship."), All Music ("...Howard's second album is a more consistent record than its predecessor, boasting a better selection of songs and grooves.") and VIBE ("...Like an album-length version of the Isley Brothers' booty-call classic "Between the Sheets," Welcome to Fantasy Island offers tracks that are smooth enough to soothe the take-charge woman."), Howard soon faced label issues.

As album delays and creative differences with her label happened (including conflict with then-Elektra Records CEO Sylvia Rhone), Howard soon found her album being shelved, and her departing from the label to get away from the music industry.

To date, Howard remains proud of the album and its cover. "Personal Freak" featuring Bizzy Bone eventually received an official digital release on his 2014 album Revival (original version), and then his 2016 compilation Confessions.

In June 2018, a promo single surfaced for "Crank Me Up" which was revealed to have been in consideration as a single by Elektra Records. It was also included on a promotional compilation titled Elektra's Fallbreakers Sampler 1997.

Track listing 
"Welcome to My Queendom" - 1:01
"(Freak) And U Know It" - 5:15
"Personal Freak" (feat. Bizzy Bone) - 4:40
"All About U" - 4:27
"Crank Me Up" (feat. Missy Elliott) - 4:20
"Sexual Needs" - 4:49
"Could've Got Away" - 3:43
"Another Level (Interlude)" - 1:41
"T-Shirt & Panties" (feat. Jamie Foxx) - 4:51
"I'll Be Damned If I Apologize" - 4:08
"Don't Come Too Fast" - 5:38
"Take Me Home" - 4:19
"Lay Him Down" - 3:44
"Ain't No Need" - 4:13
"Satisfied (Outro)" - 1:45

References 

1997 albums
Adina Howard albums